Noah Nelms (born July 30, 1996), better known under the ring name Marko Stunt, is an American professional wrestler and singer best known for his time in All Elite Wrestling  (AEW). He is also known for his appearances for Game Changer Wrestling and IWA Mid-South.

Early life 
Nelms was born on July 30, 1996, to Lori Nelms and former pastor and missionary Dwyndl Nelms. Growing up Nelms found interest in professional wrestling through his father. In a video interview by Chris Van Vliet, Nelms revealed that due to his father's role as a pastor, Nelms and his family lived in several different states in the lower mid-south as well as Costa Rica and Nicaragua. Nelms graduated from Lewisburg High School in  Olive Branch, Mississippi. During his later teen years, Nelms won his school's talent show and also found small success doing guitar covers on YouTube uploaded by his parents.

Professional wrestling career

Independent circuit (2015–2019) 
Stunt started training when he was 18. Stunt wrestled mostly locally around Mississippi and for Cape Championship Wrestling in Missouri. In January 2018, Stunt made his debut for IWA Mid-South's 800th show losing a four-way match.
At Game Changer Wrestling's Joey Janela's Lost In New York, Stunt lost to KTB; however, this exposure and his performance was popular with online wrestling fans. This performance caught the attention of Cody Rhodes and The Young Bucks who announced Stunt for All In. At All In, Stunt participated in the pre-show Over the Budget battle royal. In September 2018, Stunt competed for Pro Wrestling Guerrilla's Battle of Los Angeles where he was eliminated in the first round by Trevor Lee.

All Elite Wrestling (2019–2022) 
Marko Stunt made his All Elite Wrestling debut at the inaugural AEW Double or Nothing as part of the Casino Battle Royal entering after drawing spades. He was eliminated from the ring by Ace Romero. Later it was confirmed that Stunt had signed with AEW. Stunt found allies with Jungle Boy and Luchasaurus on Being The Elite after segments of Stunt showing him being harassed by other members of the locker room. The trio formed the Jurassic Express. Jurassic Express were announced for the Inaugural tournament for the AEW World Tag Team Championships to take on the Lucha Brothers in the first round. Marko Stunt replaced Luchasaurus for the team due to Luchasaurus suffering a hamstring injury. However, Jungle Boy and Marko Stunt lost to the Lucha Brothers, eliminating them from the rest of the tournament. Stunt was released from AEW in June 2022.

Personal life 
Nelms has a younger brother who is also a professional wrestler under the name Logan Stunt. Nelms helps run a family owned podcast called the "Stunt Family Podcast". Big Show was Nelms's favorite wrestler during his childhood, and his influences include Rey Mysterio, Kane, Chris Jericho, Eddie Guerrero and The Undertaker.

Championships and accomplishments
 Cape Championship Wrestling
 CCW Heavyweight Championship (2 time)
 CCW Tag Team Championship (1 time) - with Mikey McFinnegan
 DDT Pro-Wrestling
 Ironman Heavymetalweight Championship (1 time)
 Pro Wrestling Illustrated
 Ranked No. 182 of the top 500 singles wrestlers in the PWI 500 in 2020
 Revolution Eastern Wrestling
 REW Pakistan 24/7 Championship (1 time)
 Scenic City Invitational
 Futures Showcase Tournament (2018)
 Southern Underground Pro
 SUP Bonestorm Championship (1 time)

References

External links
 

1997 births
Living people
American male professional wrestlers
American podcasters
People from Paragould, Arkansas
Professional wrestlers from Arkansas
Professional wrestlers from Mississippi
Professional wrestling podcasters
People from Olive Branch, Mississippi
Sportspeople from Memphis, Tennessee
21st-century professional wrestlers
Ironman Heavymetalweight Champions